Nogometni klub Maribor is an association football club from Maribor, Slovenia. The club was founded in 1960 and joined the Football Association of Yugoslavia the same year. It remained a member until Slovenia gained its independence in 1991, when the club joined the Football Association of Slovenia. Maribor are one of only three Slovenian teams who participated in the Yugoslav highest division, the Yugoslav First League, between the end of the Second World War in 1945 and the breakup of Yugoslavia in 1991. Apart from winning the Yugoslav second division once and the third division five times, they had no success during the Yugoslav period; the closest they came to winning a major trophy was in the 1967–68 season, when they reached the semi-finals of the Yugoslav Cup. Since 1991, Maribor have competed in the Slovenian PrvaLiga, the highest level of football in the country. They were one of the founding members and are one of only two clubs that never dropped out of the league since the inaugural 1991–92 season. Maribor are the most successful club in the country, having won 16 PrvaLiga titles, 9 Slovenian Cups and 4 Slovenian Supercups.

Aside from winning the Slovenian title as Maribor's manager, Matjaž Kek won several championships with the club as a player. Longtime Maribor captain Marcos Tavares joined the club in 2008 and became the all-time record holder for the most appearances and most goals, with 593 appearances and 211 goals until his retirement in 2022. He also holds the club record for most appearances and goals in the Slovenian top division with 436 and 159, respectively. Furthermore, he also holds the club record for most appearances and goals in the Union of European Football Associations (UEFA) competitions, with 94 and 31, respectively.

Since Maribor was founded in 1960, more than 500 players have made a competitive first-team appearance for the club. All players who have featured in 100 or more such matches are listed below. The list also includes all current or former Maribor players who have been capped for their respective national teams.

Key

Players

The list below includes all NK Maribor players who have made at least 100 official appearances for the club or who have been capped at full international level by their countries. The list is initially ordered by the number of appearances, then by goals scored. If the players are still tied, they are listed alphabetically. The first and last columns contain the year of the player's first and last senior appearance for Maribor. The seasons column counts those seasons in which the player made at least one official appearance. For the list of Maribor's active players, see current members of the club. The table that follows is accurate as of the end of the 2021–22 season.

Footnotes
 Statistics include appearances and goals from competitive matches only, not unofficial matches such as exhibition games. During its Yugoslav period (1960–1991) Maribor competed in the Yugoslav First, Second and Third Leagues, the Slovenian Republic League, the Yugoslav Cup and the Slovenian Republic Football Cup. Since Slovenia gained independence in 1991, the club has competed domestically in the Slovenian PrvaLiga, Slovenian Cup and Slovenian Supercup, and at European level in the UEFA Champions League, UEFA Cup/UEFA Europa League, UEFA Europa Conference League, UEFA Cup Winners' Cup and UEFA Intertoto Cup.
 Milko Djurovski represented Macedonia at full international level while a Maribor player during the 1993–94 and 1994–95 seasons. In the 1980s he represented Yugoslavia. 
 In 2005, during his brief stay at the club, Rocky Siberie was eligible to play for the Netherlands Antilles, an autonomous Caribbean country within the Kingdom of the Netherlands, and has made appearances for their national team between 2004 and 2008. Since the dissolution of the country in 2010, he has represented Curaçao.

References
General

Specific

Maribor
Players
 
Association football player non-biographical articles